The 2014 Men's EuroHockey Junior Championship was the 17th edition of the men's EuroHockey Junior Championship, the biennial international men's under-21 field hockey championship of Europe organized by the European Hockey Federation. It was held alongside the women's tournament in Waterloo, Belgium between 20 and 26 July 2014.

The tournament served as a qualifier for the 2016 Men's Hockey Junior World Cup, held in Lucknow, India in December 2016.

Netherlands won the tournament for the eighth time by defeating Germany 5–2 in the final. England won the bronze medal by defeating the defending champions Belgium 4–3 in a shoot-out following a 1–1 draw.

Qualified teams

Results

Preliminary round

Pool A

Pool B

Fifth to eighth place classification

Pool C
The points obtained in the preliminary round against the other team were taken over.

First to fourth place classification

Semi-finals

Third and fourth place

Final

Statistics

Final standings

 Qualified for the 2016 Junior World Cup

 Relegated to the EuroHockey Junior Championship II

References

EuroHockey Junior Championship
Junior
EuroHockey Junior Championship
International field hockey competitions hosted by Belgium 
EuroHockey Junior Championship
EuroHockey Championship
Sport in Walloon Brabant
Waterloo, Belgium
EuroHockey Junior Championship